The Mesa Jewels were a minor league baseball team based in Mesa, Arizona in 1929. The 1947 Mesa Orphans succeeded the Jewels. The Jewels and Orphans Mesa teams played as members of the 1929 Class D level Arizona State League and 1947 Class C level Arizona-Texas League. Both teams hosted minor league home games at Rendezvous Park.

History 

Minor league baseball first came to Mesa in 1929. The Mesa "Jewels" became members of the 1929 Class D level Arizona State League, folding before the conclusion of the season. On July 24, 1929, Mesa had a 20–38 record under managers Bill Whittaker, Ernie Lloyd and Lee Dempsey when the franchise folded. Because the league was left with five teams, Mesa's opponents were given 3 wins and 1 loss for each scheduled series with Mesa. This gave the Mesa franchise a 28–61 overall record statistically. Mesa ended the season placing 6th in the official league standings, finishing 31.5 games behind the 1st place Bisbee Bees, who had a 60–30 record. The Miami Miners (50–40), Globe Bears (48–42), Tucson Cowboys (43–47) and Phoenix Senators (40–49) finished ahead of the folded Mesa franchise. Mesa did not qualify for the 1929 playoffs, won by Miami over Bisbee. The Mesa franchise was replaced by the El Paso Texans in the 1930 Arizona State League.

The Mesa use of the "Jewels" moniker corresponds to local geology and regional industry. Arizona has a long history of gemstone mining and production.

Minor league baseball returned to Mesa in 1947. On June 22, 1947, the Juarez Indios, faced with stadium issues at their home ballpark, folded from the six–team Class C level Arizona-Texas League with a 41–20 record. The Mesa Orphans began play as the replacement for Juarez on June 27, 1947. Mesa compiled a 20–49 record over the remainder of the season under manager Edward Wheeler, who managed the team in both locations. Overall the Juarez/Mesa team compiled a 61–69 overall record to place 4th in the final league standings.

The Orphans finished 19.5 games behind the 1st place Phoenix Senators, who finished with an 82–51 record. The Tucson Cowboys (80–52), Bisbee Yanks (74–59), Globe-Miami Browns (53–77) and El Paso Texans (44–86) completed the final Arizona-Texas League standings. With their stadium issues resolved, Juarez rejoined the Arizona-Texas League in 1948, replacing the Mesa location.

Today, Mesa hosts the Mesa Solar Sox, who began play as members of the Arizona Fall League in 1992.

The ballpark
The Mesa Jewels and Mesa Orphans both played home games at Rendezvous Park. Besides minor league baseball, the ballpark also hosted spring training games for the Chicago Cubs and Oakland Athletics. The Arizona State Sun Devils baseball team also played at the ballpark on occasion.

The park which contained the stadium was established in 1895, known initially as Depot Park, in reference to a nearby railway station. After the closure of the neighboring railway station, the park came to be known as Drew's Park, before being renamed to Rendezvous Park in the early 1920's. Rendezvous Park was torn down in 1976.

Today, the site hosts the Mesa Convention Center and an adjoining amphitheater, library and hotel. The Convention Center is located at 201 N. Center Street.

Timeline

Year–by–year records

Notable alumni

Edward Wheeler (1947, MGR)

References

External links
Mesa - Baseball Reference

Defunct minor league baseball teams
Professional baseball teams in Arizona
Defunct baseball teams in Arizona
Baseball teams established in 1947
Baseball teams disestablished in 1947
Mesa, Arizona
Maricopa County, Arizona
Arizona State League teams